Fritillaria monantha is a Chinese plant species in the lily family Liliaceae. It is found only in China, in the Provinces of Anhui, Henan, Hubei, Jiangxi, Sichuan, and Zhejiang.

This herbaceous perennial produces bulbs up to 20 mm in diameter. The pendent, nodding flowers are usually yellowish to pale purple, with purple spots.

References

External links
Encyclopedia of Life China,  Fritillaria monantha Migo (1939) 天目贝母  in Chinese with color photo

monantha
Endemic flora of China
Plants described in 1939